Lee Hsiu-fen (28 December 1910 – 18 January 1985) was a Chinese academic and politician. She was among the first group of women elected to the Legislative Yuan in 1948.

Biography
Lee was originally from Huailai County in Chahar Province. After graduating from Peking Normal University, she earned a master's degree at Stanford University in the United States. Returning to China, she became a professor at Guangdong Menqin University and Guangdong Provincial College of Arts & Science. She also served as headteacher of Chongqing China Women's Vocational School.

In the 1948 elections to the Legislative Yuan Lee ran as a Kuomintang candidate in Chahar Province and was elected to parliament. She relocated to Taiwan during the Chinese Civil War, where she became a professor at Chinese Culture University, Tamkang College of Arts and Sciences and Feng Chia Business School. She died in January 1985.

References

1910 births
Beijing Normal University alumni
Stanford University alumni
Academic staff of the South China Normal University
Members of the Kuomintang
20th-century Chinese women politicians
Members of the 1st Legislative Yuan
Members of the 1st Legislative Yuan in Taiwan
Academic staff of the Chinese Culture University
Academic staff of Tamkang University
Academic staff of Feng Chia University
1985 deaths